Self-Constitution: Agency, Identity, and Integrity is a philosophical book by Christine Korsgaard, in which the author sets out to demonstrate how people determine their own actions. A dialogue with Kant, Aristotle, and Plato takes place throughout the book.

See also
 Ethics
 Immanuel Kant
 Autonomy
 Self-concept

Reviews

Review in Dialogue (June 2010) by Jasper Doomen
Review in Analysis (July 2010) by Michael Ridge and Ana Barandalla
Review in The Philosophical Quarterly (January 2011) by Markus Schlosser
Review in Ethics (January 2011) by Sergio Tenenbaum

References

External links
Short description of the book 

Philosophy books